The Anti-Heroin Act of 1924 is a United States federal law prohibiting the importation and possession of opium for the chemical synthesis of an addictive narcotic known as diamorphine or heroin. The Act of Congress amended the Smoking Opium Exclusion Act of 1909 which authorized the importation of the poppy plant for medicinal purposes utilizing an opium pipe or vaporization to consume the euphoric opiate.

The H.R. 7079 legislation was passed by the 68th United States Congressional session and enacted into law by the 30th President of the United States Calvin Coolidge on June 7, 1924.

Repeal of Anti-Heroin Act
The 1924 United States public law was repealed by the enactment of Comprehensive Drug Abuse Prevention and Control Act on October 27, 1970.

World Conference on Narcotic Education 

The League of Nations and United States began participating in world narcotic conferences in the early 1900s. In 1924, United States House of Representatives passed a resolution for international conferences better known as The Hague Opium Convention.

In 1926, 69th United States Congress held hearings on a House resolution for the United States participation in the first narcotic education conference to be conducted in Philadelphia, Pennsylvania from July 5 to July 9, 1926.

In the early 1930s, the World Conference on Narcotic Education meetings were held at the Hotel McAlpin in New York City, New York where the 31st President of the United States Herbert Hoover issued public statements stressing narcotic drugs as a "fearful menace" and a "menace to society".

In popular culture

American and international motion pictures were produced promoting awareness about the adverse health effects and social implications of euphoric psychoactive drug use and heroin.

See also

Derivatives of Heroin

Narcotic Elixirs

Opium Poppy Cultivation & Production Sectors

References

External links
 
 
 
 
 
 
 
 
 
 

1924 in American law
1924 in the United States
68th United States Congress
Drug policy of the United States
History of drug control
United States federal controlled substances legislation
Heroin